The Commission for Public Service Appointments is an independent Irish statutory body which sets standards for recruitment in the public service.

The Commission is not to be confused with the Public Appointments Service.

Activities
The commission's main activities are as follows: 
issuing codes of practice
carrying out audits of recruitment and selection 
investigating complaints.

Codes of practice
The commission issues codes of practice concerning recruitment and selection. There are currently five codes of practice, relating to appointments in the Civil Service and Public Service, as well as codes to deal with specific situations such as appointment of persons with disabilities, or emergency short-term appointments in the health public sector.

Recruitment and selection audits
The commission carries out audits of recruitment and selection in the public sector, all of which are published. Sometimes these include recommendations.

Complaints
The commission also investigates complaints or formal statutory requests for review under the codes in relation to specific appointments. However it may not quash or alter a recruitment decision.

Investigations
The commission may authorize investigations with wide powers including the right of entry on premises and the right to inspect documents.

Approved recruitment agencies
In a new initiative, the commission intends to establish a list of approved recruitment agencies from the private sector which may be used for public service recruitment.

Annual reports
The commission's annual reports are submitted to each House of the Oireachtas and published on its official website. The commission is supported by a small staff.

Members of the commission

The Commission for Public Service Appointments consists of five ex-officio members, referred to as commissioners. Currently these are:
the chairman of Dáil Éireann, the Ceann Comhairle, currently Seán Ó Fearghaíl TD
the Secretary General to the Government of Ireland, currently Martin Fraser
the Secretary General, Department of Public Expenditure, National Development Plan Delivery and Reform, currently Robert Watt (as a result of legislation the Secretary General, Department of Public Expenditure, National Development Plan Delivery and Reform replaced the Secretary General, Public Service Management and Development, Department of Finance, as ex-officio member of the commission).
the chairperson of the Standards in Public Office Commission, currently Mr Justice Daniel O'Keeffe.
the Ombudsman, currently Peter Tyndall

Office and staff

In 2012 the Office of the Commission was amalgamated with the Office of the Ombudsman for administration and accounting purposes.  This was for cost-cutting purposes. As a result, the commission depends on the staff of the ombudsman.

References

External links

Ceann Comhairle’s Website
Department of the Taoiseach
Department of Public Expenditure, National Development Plan Delivery and Reform
Standards in Public Office Commission
Office of the Ombudsman

Politics of the Republic of Ireland
Government agencies of the Republic of Ireland